The PL2 class 2-6-2 is one of the industrial locomotives used by China Railway, originally built in 1935 by Nippon Sharyō for the South Manchuria Railway, which designated them Pureni (プレニ) class.

After the war, Pureni class locomotives were taken over by the China Railway, becoming class ㄆㄌ2 in 1951, later PL2 in 1959, numbers 31–50.

Preservation 
PL2-248 is preserved at Kiraku-yama park, Tsukubamirai, Ibaraki, Japan.

See also 
China Railways JF6
China Railways SY
China Railways YJ

References 

Nippon Sharyo locomotives
Railway locomotives introduced in 1935
Rolling stock of Manchukuo
Standard gauge locomotives of China
2-6-2 locomotives
Steam locomotives of China
Freight locomotives